3-Methoxymethamphetamine (also known as meta-methoxymethamphetamine or MMMA), which is most closely related to 3-methoxyamphetamine and PMMA and shares similar monoamine releasing effects, although its effects have not been studied so extensively as other related drugs. It is an agonist of human TAAR1.

See also 
 PMA
 Fenfluramine
 2-Methoxymethamphetamine
 3-Chloromethamphetamine
 3-Methoxy-4-methylamphetamine
 4-Fluoromethamphetamine
 4-Methylmethamphetamine

References 

Methamphetamines
Phenol ethers
Serotonin-norepinephrine-dopamine releasing agents
TAAR1 agonists